Jorge Berroeta (born 2 June 1918, date of death unknown) was a Chilean swimmer. He competed in the men's 200 metre breaststroke at the 1936 Summer Olympics.

References

External links
 

1918 births
Year of death missing
Chilean male breaststroke swimmers
Olympic swimmers of Chile
Swimmers at the 1936 Summer Olympics
Place of birth missing
20th-century Chilean people